Jouni Weckman is a Finnish curler.

At the national level, he is a 1996 Finnish men's champion curler.

Teams

References

External links

Living people
Finnish male curlers
Finnish curling champions
Year of birth missing (living people)
Place of birth missing (living people)